Colegrove is a former settlement located near the present day intersection of Santa Monica Boulevard and Vine Street in Los Angeles, California. 

In 1914 it was described as being south of Hollywood and north of Melrose Avenue.

The settlement was founded by Cornelius Cole on land deeded to him by Henry Hancock that had once been part of the Rancho La Brea.  A post office was first built at Colegrove in 1884, predating the post office in Hollywood by several years.  Colegrove was named for Cole's wife, Olive Colegrove Cole, and the Cole family gave their name to several streets in the Colegrove area, including Cole St., Willoughby Ave., Eleanor St. and Seward St.

In the 1890s, the Los Angeles Pacific Railroad came to Colegrove.  This railroad was eventually incorporated in the Pacific Electric Railway's Owensmouth, San Fernando and Sherman lines.

Colegrove Addition was annexed to Los Angeles in October 22, 1909. 

In 1912, a reading room opened in Colegrove; this library would be replaced by what is now the John C. Fremont Branch Library.

In more recent years, the area is sometimes referred to as South Hollywood.

References
Notes

Bibliography
 

Neighborhoods in Los Angeles
1909 disestablishments